George C. Fuller (1932-2021). was Professor of Practical Theology, Emeritus, and former president of Westminster Theological Seminary. He served as president from 1984 to 1991. Fuller was a pastor in the Presbyterian Church in America (PCA).

Fuller studied at Haverford College, Princeton Theological Seminary, Westminster Theological Seminary, and Babson College. He taught at Northwestern College and Reformed Theological Seminary prior to coming to WTS.

References

Living people
Presidents of Calvinist and Reformed seminaries
20th-century Calvinist and Reformed theologians
21st-century Calvinist and Reformed theologians
American Calvinist and Reformed theologians
Presbyterian Church in America ministers
Haverford College alumni
Princeton Theological Seminary alumni
Westminster Theological Seminary alumni
Westminster Theological Seminary faculty
Babson College alumni
Year of birth missing (living people)